IC 1574 is an irregular galaxy 17 million light-years from Earth. It is a member of the Sculptor Group, a group of galaxies near the Local Group. It was discovered by DeLisle Stewart in 1899.

References 

Cetus (constellation)
1574
Irregular galaxies
Sculptor Group